Podbiel is a village and municipality in Tvrdošín District in the Žilina Region of northern Slovakia. It contains a beautiful set of traditional wooden cottages, which have been declared a folk architecture preservation area.

History 
In historical records, the village was first mentioned in 1564.

Geography 
The municipality lies at an altitude of 555 metres and covers an area of 19.293 km2. It has a population of about 1255 people.

References

External links 
 Official website of Podbiel

Villages and municipalities in Tvrdošín District